The Macintosh LC 500 series is a series of personal computers that were a part of Apple Computer's Macintosh LC family of Macintosh computers, designed as a successor to the compact Macintosh family of computers for the mid-1990s mainstream education-market. The all-in-one desktop case is similar to the then recently introduced Macintosh Color Classic, but the LC 500 series is considerably larger and heavier due to its larger screen and a bulging midsection to house the larger electronics, including a 14" CRT display, CD-ROM drive, and stereo speakers.

The LC 500 series included four main models, the 520, 550, 575, and 580, with the 520 and 550 both using different speeds of the Motorola 68030, and the 575 and 580 sharing the 33 MHz Motorola 68LC040 processor but differing on the rest of the hardware.  All of these computers were also sold to the consumer market through department stores under the Macintosh Performa brand, with similar model numbers.  The LC models, in particular, became very popular in schools for their small footprint, lack of cable clutter, and durability. The Macintosh TV, while not branded as an LC, uses the LC 520's case (in black instead of beige) and a logic board similar to the LC 550. The compact Color Classic series shares many components, and is able to swap logic boards with the early 500 series machines.

LC 520 

The Macintosh LC 520 was introduced in June 1993. The case design was larger than the compact Macintosh models that precede it, due in large part to the significantly larger screen and CD-ROM drive. 

The LC 520 got its start as a design project codenamed "Mongo". Following the success of the Color Classic, The Apple Industrial Design Group (IDg) began exploring the adaptation of the Color Classic's design language, dubbed Espresso, for a larger display version that would also include a CD-ROM drive. However, IDg hated the design so much that they permanently shelved the final concept. In 1992, Apple CEO John Sculley demanded a large screen all-in-one design to fill out his market strategy in less than 6 months. Over IDg's objections, Apple's engineering team retrieved the shelved design and promptly put it into production. Because IDg universally detested the design, they immediately began the re-design project that would become the Power Macintosh 5200 LC series less than two years later.

The LC 520 has been described as if you "take an LC III and graft on a 14″ Trinitron monitor along with stereo speakers". The logic board of the 520 is broadly the same as the Macintosh LC III, with a Motorola 68030 CPU and an optional Motorola 68882 FPU.

A New York Times review of the LC 520 was generally positive, with columnist Peter Lewis noting that its $1,599 price point is "perhaps the best value in the entire Macintosh product line ... it would be very difficult to put together a Windows-based PC with the same features for that price, and Windows computers are usually much less expensive than Macs." Lewis also noted that the unit's 40-pound weight would make it difficult to carry home at night -- an attribute that Apple had previously marketed as a feature of compact Macintosh models in the 1980s.  MacWEEK wrote that the timing of the LC 520's release coincided with purchasing timelines for schools, and that the decision to market the computer exclusively to the education market was part of a strategic shift to move the LC brand away from the retail market.

The LC 520 was discontinued in February 1994, when it was replaced by both the faster but otherwise essentially unchanged Macintosh LC 550 and the new, 68LC040-equipped Macintosh LC 575. Apple sold upgrade kits for the LC 520 that brought it to the same specifications as the LC 550 or 575.

Models 
Initially sold only in Japan and Canada, and to U.S. educational institutions. The computer was discontinued in February 1994. Featured a caddy-loaded CD-ROM drive.

Introduced June 28, 1993:
 Macintosh LC 520: 5 MB RAM, 80 MB HDD.  U.S. educational institutions only.  $1,599 USD.
 Macintosh Performa 520: Consumer version of the LC 520. Not sold in the U.S..

LC 550 

The Macintosh LC 550 replaced the LC 520 in February 1994. The Performa variants were introduced earlier, the 550 in October 1993 and the 560 in January 1994, and remained available for more than a year longer, until April 1996. 

The main difference between the 550 and the 520 is the faster 68030 CPU, clocked at 33 MHz instead of 25 MHz, with the bus speed also increasing from 25 to 33 MHz. Unlike the 520, the optical drive was a bare-CD tray-loading type which did not require a caddy. The logic board in the 550 is essentially the same one used in the Macintosh Color Classic II, an upgrade to the original Color Classic not available in the United States. Apple also offered the same upgrade package for the 520 to the LC 575 logic board.

Two Performa variants were introduced, varying only in the software bundle that was included. The 550 included only consumer applications. The Performa 560 was called the "Money Edition" owing to a partnership between Apple and Money magazine. In addition to some consumer and education software, it also included more than a dozen business software applications.

Models 
Introduced October 18, 1993:
 Macintosh Performa 550: 160 MB HDD.

Introduced January 15, 1994:
 Macintosh Performa 560 Money Edition: The Performa 550 with bundled business software. Sold only in the United States through Circuit City locations and direct order from Apple. $2,199 USD.

Introduced February 2, 1994: 
 Macintosh LC 550

LC 575 

The Macintosh LC 575 was available from 1994 to 1996. It retains the "all-in-one" case of the LC 520/550, but uses the LC 475's architecture with a Motorola 68LC040 CPU (at a speed of 33 MHz instead of 25 MHz) and a tray-loading optical drive. It also included a high density floppy disk drive. The CPU clock is sometimes given as 66 MHz, since the clock signal is of that frequency - however, the processor itself only runs at 33 MHz. The LC 575 also introduced the comm slot, which was included in most later LC models as well.  

In May 1994, a set of Performa variants were introduced: the Performa 575, 577 and 578.  The machines are identical except for the amount of RAM and the HDD size.  Software packages included with the Performa variants include ClarisWorks 2.0, Quicken 4.0, Grolier's Encyclopedia, the 1993 Time Magazine Almanac, At Ease and some educational titles. 

David Pogue described this machine as having been "enthusiastically received by Mac fans, who appreciated their crisp color screens, speedy performance, rich sound, and upgradability to Power Macs down the line."

The LC variant was succeeded by the Macintosh LC 580 on the lower end or the PowerPC-based Power Macintosh 5200 LC models at the higher end. The Performa variants were sold until the 580 was discontinued.

This model is a favorite motherboard donor for those wishing to upgrade the Color Classic to a faster class of processor. Apple also offered an upgrade path in the form of a PowerPC Macintosh Processor Upgrade.

Models 
Introduced February 1, 1994:
 Macintosh Performa 575:5 MB RAM, 250 MB HDD.
 Macintosh Performa 577
 Macintosh Performa 578: the Performa 577 with 8 MB of RAM and 320 MB HDD.

Introduced November 3, 1994:
 Macintosh LC 575: 5 MB RAM, 160 MB HDD, CD-ROM. $1,699 USD. Sold only in the education market. An additional model with 8 MB RAM was available for volume purchase.

Hardware 
CPU: Motorola 68LC040 at 33 MHz
RAM: 5 MB (expandable to 68 MB with 1 72-pin SIMM)
Hard drive: SCSI, 160 MB (LC 575) / 250 MB (Performa 575) / 320 MB (Performa 577, Performa 578)
VRAM: 512 KB (640×480 8-bit) (expandable to 1 MB (640×480 16-bit) using 1 80 ns VRAM SIMM)
Floppy drive: 1.44 MB (can read 400 KB and 800 KB diskettes as well)
Optical drive: 2x CD-ROM
ROM Size: 1 MB
Level 1 Cache: 8 KB
Expansion: 1 LC PDS, 1 comm slot
Built-in Display: 14" Sony Trinitron Color CRT (supports up to 65,536 colors)

LC 580 

The Macintosh LC 580 was sold from April 1995 to May 1996. Like the LC 575, it is built around a Motorola 68LC040 processor, running at 33 MHz. However, instead of using the same sized, SCSI-only, logic boards based on the LC 475/Quadra 605 like the LC 575, the 580 uses the larger logic board of the Performa 630. This meant a few changes, most of them leading to lower prices, but also lower performance: Most notably, the hard drives of the 580 were IDE drives instead of SCSI drives. Also, the video RAM was no longer mounted on a SIMM, but used 1 MB of the 4 MB of main RAM soldered to the motherboard. Lastly, the Trinitron display of the 575 was replaced with a cheaper shadow mask screen, causing a slight change in the plastic case surrounding the CRT. One benefit of this change was the ability to accommodate the same video capture and TV tuner cards designed for the Performa 630.  This allowed LC 580 users to watch and record video, essentially performing the function of a television as well as a computer.

The LC 580 and LC 630 DOS Compatible, which were introduced at the same time, were last the Macintosh desktop systems to be built around a Motorola 68000-series processor. Its replacement, the Power Macintosh 5200 LC, features a PowerPC processor. Apple also offered an upgrade path for the 580 in the form of a PowerPC Macintosh Processor Upgrade. The 580 can also be upgraded with the following logic boards: 5200 LC, 6200, 5260, 5300, 6300, 5400, 6400, 5500 and 6500.

The LC 580's Performa variants were only available outside of the United States.

Models 
Introduced April 3, 1995:
 Macintosh LC 580:  8 MB RAM, 500 MB HDD, sold only in the education market.

Introduced April 13, 1995:
 Macintosh Performa 588CD: a Performa 580CD with a 500 MB hard drive, sold only in Asia and Europe

Introduced May 1, 1995:
 Macintosh Performa 580CD: Sold in Canada, Asia, Australia and New Zealand

Hardware 
Central processing unit: Motorola 68LC040 at 33 MHz; 8 KB of L1 cache

Memory: 8 MB, expandable to 52 MB with 2 72-pin SIMMs.  1 MB of the 4 MB RAM soldered on the mainboard is used as video RAM.

Storage: Hard drive is 250 MB or 500 MB IDE; floppy drive is a 1.44 MB SuperDrive (can read 400 KB and 800 KB diskettes as well); CD-ROM is a 4x AppleCD unit.

Expansion: 1 LC PDS, 1 comm slot

Display: 14″ color CRT (supports up to 65,536 colors)

Technical specifications

Timeline

References

External links 

 Guide to the Performa/Mac LC 500 Series, LC 520, LC 550, LC 575 and LC 580 at Low End Mac
 LC 520, Performa 520, LC 550, Performa 550, Performa 560, LC 575, Performa 575, Performa 577, Performa 578, LC 580, Performa 580CD, Performa 588CD at EveryMac

500
LC 500
LC 500
LC 500
LC 500
Computer-related introductions in 1993